Entresse is a shopping centre in the district of Espoon keskus in Espoo, Finland. The shopping centre was opened on 25 November 2008 and is located opposite the older shopping centre Espoontori and the Espoo train station.

Overview 
The S-Market grocery store that is now a part of Entresse was originally a Eurospar store of the SPAR chain. This store was the largest SPAR store in Finland in terms of sales area and was opened on 20 April 1999. The Eurospar store in Espoon keskus was changed into an S-Market in 2006 after the S-Group had acquired the entirety of the stock of Suomen Spar.

Shops and services 
There are slightly below 40 shops, restaurants and services in Entresse. These include for example the Espoon Keskus library, The Espoo city service point, Grocery stores S-market and Lidl, and restaurants Subway, Pizza Hut and Espresso house. Entresse also has more restaurants, Clothing stores, other shops and services, a barber shop and a van rental (Paku Kympillä).

References

External links
 Official site

Shopping centres in Espoo